This is a list of episodes of the anime series Jubei-chan: The Ninja Girl-The Counter Attack of the Siberian Yagyu created by Akitaro Daichi, produced by Madhouse and licensed by Geneon Entertainment. The series is the adaptation of The Secret of the Lovely Eyepatch that premiered in 1999. The Counter Attack of the Siberian Yagyu follows a year after the first series, introducing Freesia Yagyu, Yagyu Jubei's daughter who claims herself as the rightful owner of the "Lovely Eyepatch" and the Siberian Yagyu, a clan that was destroyed by the Edo Yagyu. Freesia tries to take the "Lovely Eyepatch" from Jiyu and at the same time, the Siberian Yagyu attempts to end the grudge on Jubei II.

The first episode first aired on 7 January 2004 and concluded on 31 March 2004. The series broadcast on TV Tokyo in Japan, ntv7 in Malaysia and Tooniverse in Korea. The episodes also broadcast on Animax, an anime television network that also broadcast the series across its English-language networks in Southeast Asia and South Asia.

For all thirteen episodes, the OP theme "Nagi ~Peace of Mind~" is performed by Okazaki Ritsuko. The ED theme, "Kokoro Harete Yoru mo Akete", is performed by Yui Horie, who also voiced Jiyuu Nanohana.

A single DVD box collection, containing all thirteen episodes of the anime, was released on 1 August 2006 by Geneon Entertainment . Four DVD compilations, the first two DVD containing five episodes and the third with three. Also, Geneon Entertainment has released four DVD compilations of the English adaptation of the series, with the first DVD compilations containing four episodes, with three episodes in the other three compilations . The first compilation was released on 28 June 2005, and the fourth on 20 December 2005.

Episode list

See also
 List of Jubei-chan characters
 List of Jubei-chan episodes

References

External links
Official website 
Geneon Entertainment's Jubei-Chan 2 English Website

Jubei-chan 2